Harney National Forest was established by the U.S. Forest Service in South Dakota and Wyoming on July 1, 1911, with  from part of Black Hills National Forest and other lands.  On July 1, 1954, the entire forest was added to Black Hills and the name was discontinued.

See also
Custer, South Dakota
Custer State Park
French Creek
Keystone, South Dakota

References

External links
 Forest History Society
 Listing of the National Forests of the United States and Their Dates (from the Forest History Society website) Text from Davis, Richard C., ed. Encyclopedia of American Forest and Conservation History. New York: Macmillan Publishing Company for the Forest History Society, 1983. Vol. II, pp. 743-788.
 
 
 

Former National Forests of South Dakota
Former National Forests of Wyoming
1911 establishments in South Dakota
1911 establishments in Wyoming